This Is Me is a 2015 Chinese youth romantic comedy film directed by Dai Rui. It was released on November 13, 2015.

Cast
Michelle Chen
Zheng Kai
Bao Bei'er
Oscar Sun
Tang Yixin
Wang Yongqiang
Tracy
Tong Jian-Kong
Deng Mei-en
Tom Price

Reception
The film grossed  on its opening weekend at the Chinese box office.

References

2015 romantic comedy films
Chinese romantic comedy films
Chinese teen films
2010s Mandarin-language films